Prefontaine Fountain is a fountain by Carl Frelinghuysen Gould, installed at Prefontaine Place, a small park in the Pioneer Square district of Seattle, Washington, near the intersection of 3rd Avenue and Yesler Way.

Description
The circular basin and wall are concrete; the low basin rim has sculptures of turtles. Blue ceramic tiles line the fountain basin.

History
The fountain is the city's oldest, completed in 1925, on land deeded to the city in 1912. The park and fountain were dedicated in June 1926 to the late Francis X. Prefontaine, a Catholic priest who built the city's first Catholic church and provided $5,000 for the fountain's construction. The park and fountain were rebuilt during construction of the Downtown Seattle Transit Tunnel and adjacent Pioneer Square station in the late 1980s, reopening in 1990.

See also

 1925 in art

References

External links

 

1925 establishments in Washington (state)
1925 sculptures
Fountains in Washington (state)
Outdoor sculptures in Seattle
Sculptures of turtles
Pioneer Square, Seattle